Loyal may refer to:

 Loyalty

Music
 Loyal (album), by Dave Dobbyn, 1988
 "Loyal" (Dave Dobbyn song)
 The Loyal, an album by Tiger Lou, 2005
 "Loyal" (Chris Brown song), 2013
 "Loyal" (PartyNextDoor song), 2019
 "Loyal", a song by Major Lazer from Major Lazer Essentials
 "Loyal", by Paloma Faith from The Architect

Places
 Loyal, Oklahoma, US
 Loyal, Wisconsin, US
 Loyal (town), Wisconsin, US
 Ben Loyal, a mountain in Sutherland, Scotland, UK

Other uses
 Loyal (Lower Canada), opponents of the Patriotes during the Lower Canada Rebellion in 1837 and 1838
 Ragamuffin 100, formerly Loyal, a racing yacht